Sensi may refer to:

Entertainment
Sensible Soccer, a series of association football (soccer) video games
"Sensi", a song by Long Beach Dub Allstars featuring Tippa Irie, from their 1999 album Right Back
"Sensi", a 2012 single by Anna Tatangelo

People
Franco Sensi (1926–2008), an Italian businessman
Giuseppe Sensi (1907–2001), an Italian Catholic cardinal and diplomat
Rosella Sensi (born 1971), an Italian businesswoman, daughter of Franco
Stefano Sensi (born 1995), an Italian footballer

Other uses
Sensi language, an extinct Panoan language
Sensi (electoral ward), an electoral ward of Kitutu Chache Constituency, Kenya
Sensi, a restaurant at the Bellagio, a Las Vegas casino
Sensi, a brand of smart thermostats by Emerson Electric
Sensi, a slang term for cannabis, derived from the term sinsemilla meaning "without seeds"

See also
Sensis (disambiguation)
Senshi (disambiguation)